Pogrebin is a surname. Notable people with the surname include:

Abigail Pogrebin (born 1965), American writer, daughter of Letty and twin sister of Robin
Letty Cottin Pogrebin (born 1939), American author, journalist, lecturer, and social activist
Robin Pogrebin (born 1965), American reporter, daughter of Letty and twin sister of Abigail